Black Duck Cove is a community located south of Twillingate, Newfoundland and Labrador, Canada. Located on the southern island of Twillingate, few people reside in Black Duck Cove.

Populated places in Newfoundland and Labrador